is a Japanese video game developer and publisher founded on February 5, 1992. The company is known for the Simple series of budget-priced video games. Their games have been released for the Game Boy Advance, Nintendo DS, Nintendo 3DS, Nintendo Switch, PlayStation Portable, PlayStation Vita, PlayStation 2, PlayStation 3, GameCube, Wii, Xbox, Xbox 360, Wii U, Android and iOS.

History
Between 2007 and 2014, D3 Publisher owned a North Carolina-based game development studio Vicious Cycle Software. In 2009, Bandai Namco Holdings gained a controlling share of D3 and currently owns 95% of its stock. After the bankruptcy of Midway Games, the company became the publisher of Cartoon Network games from 2009 until 2014, when American publisher Little Orbit took control. Both D3Publisher and Cartoon Network worked on games based on licenses such as Ben 10 and Hi Hi Puffy AmiYumi before that.

In 2015, D3 Publisher announced that D3 Publisher of America Inc. would rebrand as D3 Go! and that it would no longer publish video games but focus on publishing mobile games, but D3 Publisher Inc. in Japan would remain the same. D3 Go! is also expected to release some games from D3 Publisher Inc.

On June 27, 2022, 505 Games announced that they have acquired the assets of D3 Go!

Published games

America and Europe

Adventure Time: Hey Ice King! Why'd You Steal Our Garbage?! (NDS, 3DS)
Adventure Time: Explore the Dungeon Because I Don't Know! (PS3, X360, Wii U, 3DS)
Astro Boy: The Video Game (Wii, PS2, NDS, PSP)
Bangai-O Spirits (NDS)
Bangai-O HD: Missile Fury (XB360 (XBLA))
Ben 10: Protector of Earth (Wii, PS2, NDS, PSP)
Ben 10: Alien Force (Wii, PS2, PSP, NDS)
Ben 10 Alien Force: Vilgax Attacks (Wii, PS2, NDS, PSP, PS3, XB360)
Ben 10 Ultimate Alien: Cosmic Destruction (Wii, PS2, NDS, PSP, PS3, XB360)
Ben 10: Galactic Racing (Wii, 3DS, NDS, PS3, PS Vita, XB360)
Ben 10: Omniverse (video game) (Wii, 3DS, NDS, PS3, XB360)
Beta Bloc (PSN, PSP, PS2)
Billiard (Nintendo Switch)
Blue Dragon: Awakened Shadow (NDS)
Break 'Em All (NDS)
Coraline (Wii, XB360, PS3, PS2, NDS)
Cube (PSP)
Dark Sector (PS3, XB360, PC)
Dead Head Fred (PSP)
Despicable Me: The Game (PS2, PSP, Wii, NDS)
Dragon Blade: Wrath of Fire (Wii)
Earth Defense Force 2017 (XB360)
Earth Defense Force 2017 Portable (PS Vita)
Earth Defense Force 2025 (PS3, XB360)
Earth Defense Force 4.1: The Shadow of New Despair (PS4, PC)
Earth Defense Force 5 (PS4, PC)
Earth Defense Force: Insect Armageddon (PS3, XB360, PC)
Earth Defense Force: Iron Rain (PS4, PC)
Eat Lead: The Return of Matt Hazard (PS3, XB360)
Ed, Edd n Eddy: Scam of the Century (NDS)
Flushed Away (GCN, NDS, GBA, PS2)
G.I. Joe: War On Cobra (iOS, Android)
Gods Eater Burst (Published in North America) (PSP)
Hi Hi Puffy AmiYumi: Kaznapped! (GBA)
Hi Hi Puffy AmiYumi: The Genie and the Amp (NDS)
Kamen Rider: Dragon Knight (Wii, NDS)
Kid Adventures: Sky Captain (Wii)
Kidz Bop Dance Party! The Video Game (Wii)
Madagascar 3: The Video Game (PS3, NDS, 3DS, Wii, XB360)
Magic: The Gathering – Puzzle Quest (iOS, Android)
Marvel Puzzle Quest (iOS, Android, PC)
Matt Hazard: Blood Bath and Beyond (PS3 (PSN), XB360 (XBLA))
Naruto: Clash of Ninja series (GCN, Wii)
Naruto: Ninja Council series (GBA, NDS)
OneChanbara: Bikini Samurai Squad (XB360)
OneChanbara: Bikini Zombie Slayers (Wii)
Puzzle Quest: Challenge of the Warlords (PS2, PS3, PSP, NDS, Wii, XB360, PC, IP)
Puzzle Quest 2 (XB360, NDS, PC)
Puzzle Quest: Galactrix (NDS, PC, PS3, XB360)
Regular Show: Mordecai and Rigby In 8-Bit Land (3DS)
Rise of the Guardians (PS3, NDS, 3DS, Wii, Wii U, XB360)
Shaun the Sheep (NDS)
Snowboard Racer 2 (PS2)
Tennis (Nintendo Switch)
THE Bass Fishing (Nintendo Switch)
The Croods: Prehistoric Party! (NDS, 3DS, Wii, Wii U)
The Secret Saturdays: Beasts of the 5th Sun (PS2, PSP, NDS, Wii)
Turbo: Super Stunt Squad (PS3, NDS, 3DS, Wii, Wii U, XB360)
Victorious: Hollywood Arts Debut (NDS)
Victorious: Taking the Lead (Wii, NDS)
Victorious: Time to Shine (XB360)
White Knight Chronicles II (Published in North America) (PS3)
Work Time Fun (PSP)
Zombie Virus (PS2) (Europe Only)

Japan

Bae Yong-joon to Manabu Kankokugo DS (NDS)
Bae Yong-joon to Manabu Kankokugo DS Date Hen (NDS)
Bae Yong-joon to Manabu Kankokugo DS Test Hen (NDS)
Bangai-O HD: Missile Fury (XB360 (XBLA))
BioShock 2 (Published in Japan) (PS3, XB360)
Bullet Girls (PS Vita)
Bullet Girls 2 (PS Vita)
Chicken Little (PS2, GC, GBA) (Japan Only)
Dark Sector (PS3, XB360, PC)
Dead Head Fred (PSP)
Dragon Blade: Wrath of Fire (Wii)
Dream Club (XB360, PSP)
Dream Club Zero (XB360, PS Vita)
Dream Club GoGo (PS3)
Earth Defense Force (PS2)
Earth Defense Force 2 (PS2)
Earth Defense Force 2 Portable (PSP)
Earth Defense Force 2 Portable V2 (PS Vita)
Earth Defense Force 3 (XB360)
Earth Defense Force 3 Portable (PS Vita)
Earth Defense Force 4 (PS3, XB360)
Earth Defense Force 4.1: The Shadow of New Despair (PS4, PC)
Earth Defense Force 5 (PS4)
Earth Defense Force: Insect Armageddon (PS3, XB360, PC)
Earth Defense Force: Iron Rain (PS4)
Earth Defense Force Tactics (PS2)
Fuyu no Sonata DS (NDS)
Eat Lead: The Return of Matt Hazard (PS3, XB360)
Machiing Maker (series) (PS2, PSP, NDS, PS3, XB360)
Maglam Lord (PS4, Nintendo Switch)
Abyss of the Sacrifice (PSP)
Natsuiro High School: Seishun Hakusho (PS3, PS4)
Neon Genesis Evangelion (Pachinko series) (PS2, NDS, PSP)
Omega Labyrinth (PS Vita)
Onnanoko to Misshitsu ni Itara OO Shichau Kamo Shirenai. (3DS)
Ten (PS2)
The Chronicles of Narnia: The Lion, the Witch and the Wardrobe (PS2 & NDS) (Japan Only)
The Incredibles (PS2, Xbox, GC, GBA) (Japan Only)
The OneChanbara series (PS2, PS4, XB360, Wii, PC, PSP)
School Girl/Zombie Hunter (PS4)
Simple series (PS, PS2, PSP, PS3 (PSN), DC, GBA, NDS, Wii, 3DS)
 Snowboard Racer 2 (PS2)

Otome games 

Bakumatsu Renka (series) (PS2, PSP, NDS)
Dear My Sun!!: Musuko Ikusei Kyousoukyoku (PS2)
  Forbidden Romance (series) (Android, iOS, Windows, Nintendo Switch) 
Hoshizora no Comic Garden (NDS)
Houkago no Love Beat (PS2)
Kurayami no Hate de Kimi wo Matsu (NDS)
Last Escort (series) (PS2, PSP)
Little Anchor (PS2)
Mermaid Prism (PS2)
Ore no Shita de Agake (BL game) (PS2)
Reijou Tantei Office Love Jikenbo (PS2)
Saikin Koi Shiteru? (NDS)
Signal (NDS)
Storm Lover (PSP)
Storm Lover: Natsukoi!! (PSP)
Suto*Mani: Strobe*Mania (PSP)
Teikoku Kaigun Koibojou ~Meiji Yokosuka Koushinkyoku~ (PSV)
 The Charming Empire (Android, iOS, Windows, PSV, Nintendo Switch) 
Vampire Knight DS (NDS)
Vitamin (video game series) (PS2, NDS, PSP, 3DS, Vita)
Nightshade/Hyakka Hyakurou (PSV, Windows, Nintendo Switch)

See also
Entertainment Software Publishing

Notes

References

External links

  
  
 

Software companies based in Tokyo
Video game companies established in 1992
Video game companies of Japan
Bandai Namco Holdings subsidiaries
Video game publishers
Video game development companies
Japanese companies established in 1992
2009 mergers and acquisitions